The Santa Barbara Apartments is a building complex on Hawthorne Boulevard in southeast Portland, Oregon listed on the National Register of Historic Places.

See also
 National Register of Historic Places listings in Southeast Portland, Oregon

References

Further reading

External links

1928 establishments in Oregon
Hosford-Abernethy, Portland, Oregon
Portland Eastside MPS
Residential buildings completed in 1928
Apartment buildings on the National Register of Historic Places in Portland, Oregon
Spanish Revival architecture in Oregon
Portland Historic Landmarks